Luke John Vivian (born 12 June 1981) is a former New Zealand cricketer who played Twenty20 and List-A matches for Canterbury and Auckland from 2006 to 2009. He played as a right-handed middle-order batsman. In the T20 match for Auckland against Central Districts in 2008–09 he made 55 not out off only 18 balls, with six sixes, to take Auckland to a six-wicket victory with seven balls to spare.

References

External links

1981 births
Living people
Cricketers from Launceston, Tasmania
New Zealand cricketers
Auckland cricketers
Canterbury cricketers